The Cedar Key Historical Society and Museum is located at 609 2nd Street State Road 24, Cedar Key, Florida. It contains exhibits and photographs depicting the history of Cedar Key from prehistoric times through the 20th century, Cedar Key Historical Society, 2008. Accessed August 16, 2008 (updated 09/21/21 WebDev).  The museum complex is composed of two buildings, the Lutterloh House serving as the main entrance and the annex is the Andrews House, which was originally on Atsena Otie Key before being moved to the mainland after the 1896 hurricane. It is part of the Cedar Keys Historic and Archaeological District.

In 1989, it was listed as the John Lutterloh Residence - Cedar Key Historical Society and Museum in A Guide to Florida's Historic Architecture, published by the University of Florida Press.

Footnotes

External links

Websites
Cedar Key Historical Society and Museum (official website)

History museums in Florida
Museums in Levy County, Florida
Historical society museums in Florida
Museums established in 1977
1977 establishments in Florida
Cedar Key, Florida